Zieria oreocena, commonly known as Grampians zieria, is a plant in the citrus family Rutaceae and is endemic to Victoria, Australia. It is a spindly shrub with glabrous, three-part, clover-like leaves and clusters of up to thirty white flowers with four petals and four stamens. It is a rare species, only found in the northern Grampians.

Description
Its branches are glabrous, dotted with translucent glands and have distinct ridges. The flowers are arranged in clusters of between 7 and 29 in leaf axils, the clusters shorter than the leaves. There are four stamens. Flowering occurs in spring and is followed by fruit which are glabrous capsules containing striped reddish-brown seeds.

Taxonomy and naming
Zieria oreocena was first formally described in 2002 by James Armstrong from a specimen collected near Mount Zero in the Grampians and the description was published in Australian Systematic Botany. The specific epithet is derived from Greek words meaning "a mountain" and "empty", referring to the Mount Zero area, where the type specimens were collected.

Distribution and habitat
Grampians zieria grows in woodland and shrubland in the northern Grampians.

References

External links
 

oreocena
Sapindales of Australia
Flora of Victoria (Australia)
Plants described in 2002